Larena, L'Arena, Larenas or variant,  may refer to:

L'Arena 

 L'Arena, Italian newspaper
 San Juan de La Arena (L'Arena), Spanish municipality

Larena 
 Larena, municipality in Siquijor, Philippines

Surnamed "Larena"
 Demetrio Larena, Filipino governor
 Jorge Larena (born 1981), Spanish soccer player

Larenas 

 Isla Larenas, Chile; see List of islands of Chile

Surnamed "Larenas"
 Mario Larenas (born 1994), Chilean soccer player
 Carlos Marcio Camus Larenas (1927-2014), Chilean bishop

See also 
 Arena (disambiguation)
 Arenas (disambiguation)